Penicillic acid is a mycotoxin that is produced by Aspergillus flavus and Penicillium roqueforti mold. It is also the major product of acid degradation of penicillin. Its first practical synthesis was reported in 1947 by Ralph Raphael, who had worked on penicillin during World War II.

References

Mycotoxins
Furanones